The Blot on the Shield is a 1915 short film directed by B. Reeves Eason.

Cast
 Dick La Reno
 Vivian Rich
 Walter Spencer

External links

1915 films
1915 short films
American silent short films
American black-and-white films
Films directed by B. Reeves Eason
1910s American films